is a Japanese-born American retired pair skater. With partner John Baldwin, she is the 2004 and 2006 U.S. National Champion. Inoue previously competed for Japan as both a single skater and pair skater. Inoue and Baldwin are the first skaters to perform a throw triple Axel in competition.

Personal life
Rena Inoue was born in Nishinomiya, Hyōgo, Japan. She moved to the United States in 1996 at the urging of her father, who had been diagnosed with lung cancer. In 1998, less than two years after her father's death, Inoue was also diagnosed with lung cancer. It was detected early, and after six months of chemotherapy, she was cancer-free.

Inoue graduated from Waseda University in 1999 with a degree in education. She became a U.S. citizen in 2005. Inoue became engaged to be married to skating partner John Baldwin in January 2008. They had a daughter in November 2011.

Career

Competing for Japan
Rena Inoue began skating at age four. She competed in the disciplines of single skating and pair skating in Japan. As a single skater, Inoue is the 1994 Japanese silver medalist and 1998 bronze medalist. She represented Japan at the 1994 Winter Olympics in singles and placed 18th. She competed for Japan in singles through 1999.

As a pair skater, Inoue competed with Tomoaki Koyama. They were the 1991 and 1992 Japanese national champions. They represented Japan at the 1992 Winter Olympics and placed 14th.

Competing for the United States
While living in the United States, Inoue was paired with John Baldwin by his father, a coach. Inoue and Baldwin tried out and agreed to form the partnership. They began competing together in 2000.

They placed 11th at the 2001 U.S. Championships. The following season, they won the pewter medal at the 2002 U.S. Championships. They were sent to the 2002 Four Continents, their first international competition together, and placed 7th.

In the 2002–2003 season, Inoue / Baldwin competed on the Grand Prix circuit for the first time. Returning to Nationals, they won the bronze medal. They withdrew from the 2003 Four Continents, but placed 10th at the 2003 World Championships.

In the 2003–2004 season, they improved on their Grand Prix results and won their first national title. They placed 4th at the 2004 Four Continents and repeated their 10th-place finish at the 2004 World Championships.

In the 2004–2005 season, they medalled for the first time on the Grand Prix and qualified for the Grand Prix Final, where they placed 6th. They won the silver medal at the 2005 U.S. Figure Skating Championships and placed 11th at the 2005 World Championships.

In the 2005–2006 season, Inoue / Baldwin medalled on the Grand Prix. At the 2006 U.S. Championships, Inoue and Baldwin became the first pair to successfully perform a throw triple Axel in competition. They went on to the 2006 Four Continents, which they won. At the 2006 Winter Olympics, they made Olympic and international history when they landed the throw triple Axel for the first time in international competition. They placed 7th overall. At the 2006 World Figure Skating Championships, they placed 4th.

In the 2006–2007 season, Inoue / Baldwin won the gold medal at the 2006 Skate America after winning the short program and placing second in the free skate. They won the silver medal at 2006 Skate Canada International the next week; and then won the silver at 2006 Trophée Eric Bompard one week later. They qualified for the Grand Prix Final. While in Saint Petersburg for that competition, Baldwin was abducted, assaulted and robbed, though he and Inoue were still able to compete, and finished fourth. At the 2007 U.S. Championships, they won the silver medal. They placed 8th at the 2007 World Championships.

In the 2007–2008 season, Inoue / Baldwin sat out the Grand Prix series, choosing to skate in shows instead. Returning to competition at the 2008 U.S. Championships, they won the silver medal. While they were taking their bows following their free skate, Baldwin proposed marriage to Inoue on the ice and she accepted. Inoue / Baldwin competed at the 2008 World Championships, where they placed 10th.

Inoue / Baldwin were 5th at the 2008 Skate America and won the silver medal at the 2008 NHK Trophy.

Programs 
(with Baldwin)

Competitive highlights
GP: Champions Series / Grand Prix

Pairs career with John Baldwin for the United States

Singles career for Japan

Pairs career with Koyama for Japan

References

External links

 
 
 

1976 births
Living people
American female pair skaters
Japanese female single skaters
Japanese female pair skaters
Figure skaters at the 1992 Winter Olympics
Figure skaters at the 1994 Winter Olympics
Figure skaters at the 2006 Winter Olympics
Olympic figure skaters of Japan
Olympic figure skaters of the United States
People from Nishinomiya
Japanese emigrants to the United States
American sportspeople of Japanese descent
Four Continents Figure Skating Championships medalists
Universiade medalists in figure skating
Universiade silver medalists for Japan
Competitors at the 1997 Winter Universiade
21st-century American women